Doto cristal is a species of sea slug, a nudibranch, a marine gastropod mollusc in the family Dotidae.

Distribution
This species was described from a single specimen, 2.5 mm in length, collected at Manzanillo, Limón, Costa Rica.

Description
This nudibranch is transparent with no pigment apart from a few white glands in the rhinophore sheaths and rhinophores. The cerata have rather pointed tubercles and are also transparent with snow white digestive gland inside them.

EcologyDoto cristal'' was found amongst algae.

References

Dotidae
Gastropods described in 2010